Gehyra pamela, also known commonly as the Arnhemland watercourse dtella or the Arnhem Land spotted dtella, is a species of gecko, a lizard in the family Gekkonidae. The species is endemic to the Northern Territory in Australia.

Etymology
The specific name, pamela, is in honor of Pamela King, who is the wife of taxon author Max King.

Taxonomy
Gehyra pamela is part of the Gehyra australis species complex.

Reproduction
G. pamela is oviparous.

References

Further reading
Cogger HG (2014). Reptiles and Amphibians of Australia, Seventh Edition. Clayton, Victoria, Australia: CSIRO Publishing. xxx + 1,033 pp. .
King M (1982). "Karyotypic Evolution in Gehyra (Gekkonidae: Reptilia) II. A New Species from the Alligator Rivers Region in Northern Australia". Australian Journal of Zoology 30 (1): 93–101. (Gehyra pamela, new species).
Wilson, Steve; Swan, Gerry (2013). A Complete Guide to Reptiles of Australia, Fourth Edition. Sydney: New Holland Publishers. 522 pp. .

Gehyra
Reptiles described in 1982
Geckos of Australia